Tsing Yi Rural Committee is a rural committee dealing with matters of the village of Tsing Yi Island in Hong Kong.

Representatives

See also

 List of villages in Hong Kong

Tsing Yi
Rural Committees